The 2014 Los Angeles Angels of Anaheim season was the franchise's 54th season and 49th in Anaheim (all of them at Angel Stadium).

The Angels achieved a historically significant milestone during the course of the season by improving their all-time winning percentage to above the .500 mark. The Angels won their 89th game of the season on September 9 to ensure that they would become the first post-1960 expansion team to finish a season with an all-time winning record since the Houston Astros at the conclusion of the 2006 MLB season.

The Angels finished the season with the best record in all of Major League Baseball, but they were swept by the Kansas City Royals in the American League Division Series.

Standings

Season standings

American League West

American League Division Leaders

Record vs. opponents

Game log

|- style="text-align:center; background:#fbb;"
| 1 || March 31 || Mariners || 3–10 || Hernández (1–0) || Weaver (0–1) || || 44,152 || 0–1
|-

|- style="text-align:center; background:#fbb;"
| 2 || April 1 || Mariners || 3–8 || Ramírez (1–0) || Wilson (0–1) || || 43,567 || 0–2
|- style="text-align:center; background:#fbb;"
| 3 || April 2 || Mariners || 2–8 || Paxton (1–0) || Santiago (0–1) || || 38,007 || 0–3
|- style="text-align:center; background:#bfb"
| 4 || April 4 || @ Astros || 11–1 || Richards (1–0) || Harrell (0–1) || || 15,611 || 1–3
|- style="text-align:center; background:#bfb"
| 5 || April 5 || @ Astros || 5–1 || Skaggs (1–0) || Keuchel (0–1) || || 28,515 || 2–3
|- style="text-align:center; background:#fbb;"
| 6 || April 6 || @ Astros || 4–7 || Feldman (2–0) || Weaver (0–2) || Qualls (1) || 14,786 || 2–4
|- style="text-align:center; background:#bfb"
| 7 || April 7 || @ Astros || 9–1 || Wilson (1–1) || Cosart (1–1) || || 17,936 || 3–4
|- style="text-align:center; background:#fbb;"
| 8 || April 8 || @ Mariners || 3–5 || Paxton (2–0) || Santiago (0–2) || Rodney (2) || 45,661 || 3–5
|- style="text-align:center; background:#bfb"
| 9 || April 9 || @ Mariners || 2–0 || Richards (2–0) || Elías (0–1) || Frieri (1) || 16,437 || 4–5
|- style="text-align:center; background:#bfb"
| 10 || April 11 || Mets || 5–4 (11) || Kohn (1–0) || Familia (0–2) || || 42,871 || 5–5
|- style="text-align:center; background:#fbb;"
| 11 || April 12 || Mets || 6–7 (13) || Lannan (1–0) || Shoemaker (0–1) || || 40,027 || 5–6
|- style="text-align:center; background:#bfb;"
| 12 || April 13 || Mets || 14–2 || Wilson (2–1) || Colón (1–2) || || 38,855 || 6–6
|- style="text-align:center; background:#fbb;"
| 13 || April 14 || Athletics || 2–3 || Johnson (1–2) || Frieri (0–1) || Gregerson (2) || 37,120 || 6–7
|- style="text-align:center; background:#fbb;"
| 14 || April 15 || Athletics || 9–10 (11) || Johnson (2–2) || Herrera (0–1) || || 34,887 || 6–8
|- style="text-align:center; background:#bfb"
| 15 || April 16 || Athletics || 5–4 (12) || Smith (1–0) || Pomeranz (1–1) || || 37,344 || 7–8
|- style="text-align:center; background:#bfb"
| 16 || April 18 || @ Tigers || 11–6 || Weaver (1–2) || Smyly (1–1) || || 28,435 || 8–8
|- style="text-align:center; background:#fbb;"
| 17 || April 19 || @ Tigers || 2–5 || Scherzer (1–1) || Wilson (2–2) || || 36,659 || 8–9 
|- style="text-align:center; background:#fbb"
| 18 || April 20 || @ Tigers || 1–2 || Porcello (2–1) || Santiago (0–3) || Nathan (3) || 28,921 || 8–10
|- style="text-align:center; background:#bfb"
| 19 || April 21 || @ Nationals || 4–2 || Salas (1–0) || Clippard (1–2) || Frieri (2) || 24,371 || 9–10
|- style="text-align:center; background:#bfb"
| 20 || April 22 || @ Nationals || 7–2 || Skaggs (2–0) || Jordan (0–3) || || 21,915 || 10–10
|- style="text-align:center; background:#fbb;"
| 21 || April 23 || @ Nationals || 4–5 || Storen (2–0) || Frieri (0–2) || || 22,504 || 10–11
|- style="text-align:center; background:#bfb"
| 22 || April 25 || @ Yankees || 13–1 || Wilson (3–2) || Kuroda (2–2) || || 38,358 || 11–11
|- style="text-align:center; background:#fbb;"
| 23 || April 26 || @ Yankees || 3–4 || Betances (1–0) || Santiago (0–4) || Robertson (3) || 40,908 || 11–12
|- style="text-align:center; background:#fbb;"
| 24 || April 27 || @ Yankees || 2–3 || Warren (1–1) || Kohn (1–1) || Robertson (4) || 40,028 || 11–13
|- style="text-align:center; background:#bfb"
| 25 || April 28 || Indians || 6–3 || Salas (2–0) || Masterson (0–1) || Smith (1) || 37,654 || 12–13
|- style="text-align:center; background:#bfb"
| 26 || April 29 || Indians || 6–4 || Weaver (2–2) || Kluber (2–3) || Smith (2) || 35,131 || 13–13
|- style="text-align:center; background:#bfb"
| 27 || April 30 || Indians || 7–1 || Wilson (4–2) || McAllister (3–2) || || 33,334 || 14–13
|-

|- style="text-align:center; background:#fbb;"
| 28 || May 2 || Rangers || 2–5 || Lewis (2–1) || Santiago (0–5) || Soria (7) || 42,989 || 14–14
|- style="text-align:center; background:#bfb"
| 29 || May 3 || Rangers || 5–3 || Richards (3–0) || Tolleson (0–1) || Smith (3) || 39,107 || 15–14
|- style="text-align:center; background:#fbb;"
| 30 || May 4 || Rangers || 3–14 || Darvish (2–1) || Skaggs (2–1) || || 37,765 || 15–15
|- style="text-align:center; background:#bfb"
| 31 || May 5 || Yankees || 4–1 || Weaver (3–2) || Kelley (0–2) || Frieri (3) || 39,701 || 16–15
|- style="text-align:center; background:#fbb;"
| 32 || May 6 || Yankees || 3–4 || Kelley (1–2) || Frieri (0–3) || Robertson (5) || 41,106 || 16–16
|- style="text-align:center; background:#fbb;"
| 33 || May 7 || Yankees || 2–9 || Nuño (1–0) || Santiago (0–6) || || 44,083 || 16–17
|- style="text-align:center; background:#bfb"
| 34 || May 9 || @ Blue Jays || 4–3 || Smith (2–0) || Cecil (0–3) || Frieri (4) || 21,383 || 17–17
|- style="text-align:center; background:#bfb"
| 35 || May 10 || @ Blue Jays || 5–3 || Skaggs (3–1) || Happ (1–1) || Smith (4) || 31,412 || 18–17
|- style="text-align:center; background:#bfb"
| 36 || May 11 || @ Blue Jays || 9–3 || Weaver (4–2) || Hutchison (1–3) || || 20,871 || 19–17
|- style="text-align:center; background:#fbb;"
| 37 || May 12 || @ Blue Jays || 3–7 || Buehrle (7–1) || Wilson (4–3) || Delabar (8) || 13,603 || 19–18
|- style="text-align:center; background:#bfb"
| 38 || May 13 || @ Phillies || 4–3 || Shoemaker (1–1) || Lee (3–4) || Frieri (5) || 41,959 || 20–18
|- style="text-align:center; background:#bfb"
| 39 || May 14 || @ Phillies || 3–0 || Richards (4–0) || Burnett (2–3) || Smith (5) || 33,308 || 21–18
|- style="text-align:center; background:#bfb"
| 40 || May 15 || Rays || 6–5 || Salas (3–0) || Boxberger (0–1) || || 34,441 || 22–18
|- style="text-align:center; background:#fbb"
| 41 || May 16 || Rays || 0–3 || Archer (3–2) || Weaver (4–3) || Balfour (8) || 38,796 || 22–19
|- style="text-align:center; background:#bfb"
| 42 || May 17 || Rays || 6–0 || Wilson (5–3) || Ramos (1–3) ||  || 42,224 || 23–19
|- style="text-align:center; background:#bfb"
| 43 || May 18 || Rays || 6–2 || Shoemaker (2–1) || Price (4–4) || || 36,655 || 24–19
|- style="text-align:center; background:#fbb"
| 44 || May 19 || Astros || 2–5 || Keuchel (5–2) || Richards (4–1) || || 33,150 || 24–20
|- style="text-align:center; background:#bfb"
| 45 || May 20 || Astros || 9–3 || Skaggs (4–1) || Feldman (2–2) || || 30,150 || 25–20
|- style="text-align:center; background:#bfb"
| 46 || May 21 || Astros || 2–1 || Weaver (5–3) || McHugh (2–3) ||  || 40,112 || 26–20
|- style="text-align:center; background:#bfb"
| 47 || May 23 || Royals || 6–1 || Wilson (6–3) || Duffy (2–4) || || 35,082 || 27–20
|- style="text-align:center; background:#fbb"
| 48 || May 24 || Royals || 4–7 (13) || Crow (2–1) || Morin (0–1) || Holland (14) || 42,140 || 27–21
|- style="text-align:center; background:#bfb"
| 49 || May 25 || Royals || 4–3 || Kohn (2–1) || Collins (0–3) || Frieri (6) || 36,114 || 28–21
|- style="text-align:center; background:#fbb"
| 50 || May 26 || @ Mariners || 1–5 || Young (4–2) || Skaggs (4–2) || || 22,710 || 28–22
|- style="text-align:center; background:#bfb"
| 51 || May 27 || @ Mariners || 6–4 || Weaver (6–3) || Elías (3–4) || Frieri (7) || 13,064 || 29–22
|- style="text-align:center; background:#fbb"
| 52 || May 28 || @ Mariners || 1–3 || Hernández (7–1) || Wilson (6–4) || Rodney (13) || 13,895 || 29–23
|- style="text-align:center; background:#bfb"
| 53 || May 29 || @ Mariners || 7-5 || Shoemaker (3-1) || Maurer (1-4) || Frieri (8) || 11,657 || 30-23
|- style="text-align:center; background:#fbb"
| 54 || May 30 || @ Athletics || 5–9 || Pomeranz (5–2) || Richards (4–2) || || 23,384 || 30–24
|- style="text-align:center; background:#fbb"
| 55 || May 31 || @ Athletics || 3–11 || Rodriguez (1–0) || Skaggs (4–3) || || 35,067 || 30–25
|-

|- style="text-align:center; background:#fbb"
| 56 || June 1 || @ Athletics || 3–6 || Gray (6–1) || Weaver (6–4) || Doolittle (5) || 32,231 || 30–26
|- style="text-align:center; background:#fbb"
| 57 || June 3 || @ Astros || 2–7 || McHugh (4–3) || Wilson (6–5) || || 23,219 || 30–27
|- style="text-align:center; background:#bfb"
| 58 || June 4 || @ Astros || 4–0 || Richards (5–2) || Cosart (4–5) || || 23,902 || 31–27
|- style="text-align:center; background:#fbb"
| 59 || June 5 || @ Astros || 5–8 || Peacock (2–4) || Skaggs (4–4) || Qualls (6) || 24,672 || 31–28
|- style="text-align:center; background:#bfb"
| 60 || June 6 || White Sox || 8–4 || Weaver (7–4) || Rienzo (4–3) || || 38,521 || 32–28
|- style="text-align:center; background:#bfb"
| 61 || June 7 || White Sox || 6–5 || Rasmus (1–0) || Petricka (0–1) || Frieri (9) || 39,089 || 33–28
|- style="text-align:center; background:#bfb"
| 62 || June 8 || White Sox || 4–2 || Wilson (7–5) || Quintana (3–6) || Frieri (10) || 35,793 || 34–28
|- style="text-align:center; background:#bfb"
| 63 || June 9 || Athletics || 4–1 || Richards (6–2) || Chavez (5–4) || Frieri (11) || 36838 || 35–28
|- style="text-align:center; background:#bfb"
| 64 || June 10 || Athletics || 2–1 (14) || Rasmus (2–0) || Francis (0–2) || || 31,942 || 36–28
|- style="text-align:center; background:#fbb"
| 65 || June 11 || Athletics || 1–7 || Milone (4–3) || Weaver (7–5) || || 36,793 || 36–29
|- style="text-align:center; background:#fbb"
| 66 || June 13 || @ Braves || 3–4 || Harang (5–5) || Wilson (7–6) || Kimbrel (19) || 39,699 || 36–30
|- style="text-align:center; background:#bfb"
| 67 || June 14 || @ Braves || 11–6 (13) || Salas (4–0) || Hale (2–1) || || 48,559 || 37–30
|- style="text-align:center; background:#fbb"
| 68 || June 15 || @ Braves || 3–7 || Varvaro (2–1) || Santiago (0–7) || Kimbrel (20) || 29,320 || 37–31
|- style="text-align:center; background:#fbb"
| 69 || June 16 || @ Indians || 3–4 || Bauer (2–3) || Weaver (7–6) || Carrasco (1) || 14,716 || 37–32
|- style="text-align:center; background:#bfb"
| 70 || June 17 || @ Indians || 9–3 || Shoemaker (4–1) || Tomlin (4–4) || || 14,639 || 38–32
|- style="text-align:center; background:#bbb"
|  || June 18 || @ Indians || colspan=6| Postponed (rain). Makeup: September 8
|- style="text-align:center; background:#fbb"
| 71 || June 19 || @ Indians || 3–5 || Crockett (1–0)|| Bedrosian (0–1) || || 20,361 || 38–33
|- style="text-align:center; background:#bfb"
| 72 || June 20 || Rangers || 7–3 || Richards (7–2) || Saunders (0–3) || || 41,637 || 39–33
|- style="text-align:center; background:#bfb"
| 73 || June 21 || Rangers || 3–2 (10) || Morin (1–1) || Cotts (2–4) || || 37,026 || 40–33
|- style="text-align:center; background:#bfb"
| 74 || June 22 || Rangers || 5–2 || Shoemaker (5–1) || Darvish (7–4) || || 37,191 || 41–33
|- style="text-align:center; background:#bfb"
| 75 || June 24 || Twins || 8–6 || Wilson (8–6) || Gibson (6–6) || Smith (6) || 37,086 || 42–33
|- style="text-align:center; background:#bfb"
| 76 || June 25 || Twins || 6–2 || Richards (8–2) || Pino (0–1) || || 39,082 || 43–33
|- style="text-align:center; background:#bfb"
| 77 || June 26 || Twins || 6–4 || Weaver (8–6) || Nolasco (4–6) || Smith (7) || 32,209 || 44–33
|- style="text-align:center; background:#fbb"
| 78 || June 27 || @ Royals || 6–8 || Mariot (1–0) || Shoemaker (5–2) || Holland (23) || 35,461 || 44–34
|- style="text-align:center; background:#bfb"
| 79 || June 28 || @ Royals || 6–2 || Morin (2–1) || Ventura (5–7) || || 21,093 || 45–34
|- style="text-align:center; background:#fbb"
| 80 || June 29 || @ Royals || 4–5 || Holland (1–2) || Grilli (0–3) || || 27,803 || 45–35
|- style="text-align:center; background:#bbb"
| || June 30 || @ White Sox || colspan=6| Postponed (rain). Makeup: July 1
|-

|- style="text-align:center; background:#bfb"
| 81 || July 1 || @ White Sox || 8–4 || Richards (9–2) || Noesí (2–6) || Smith (8) || 20,233 || 46–35
|- style="text-align:center; background:#bfb"
| 82 || July 1 || @ White Sox || 7–5 || Weaver (9–6) || Carroll (2–5) || Smith (9) || 20,233 || 47–35
|- style="text-align:center; background:#fbb"
| 83 || July 2 || @ White Sox || 2–3 || Putnam (3–1) || Morin (2–2) || || 18,207 || 47–36
|- style="text-align:center; background:#bfb"
| 84 || July 3 || Astros || 5–2 || Shoemaker (6–2) || Oberholtzer (2–7) || Smith (10) || 37,625 || 48–36
|- style="text-align:center; background:#bfb"
| 85 || July 4 || Astros || 7–6 || Smith (3–0) || Sipp (1–1) || || 43,557 || 49–36
|- style="text-align:center; background:#bfb"
| 86 || July 5 || Astros || 11–5 || Roth (1–0) || Bass (1–1) || || 40,479 || 50–36
|- style="text-align:center; background:#bfb"
| 87 || July 6 || Astros || 6–1 || Richards (10–2) || McHugh (4–8) || || 33,552 || 51–36
|- style="text-align:center; background:#bfb"
| 88 || July 7 || Blue Jays || 5–2 || Shoemaker (7–2) || Happ (7–5) || Smith (11) || 38,189 || 52–36
|- style="text-align:center; background:#fbb"
| 89 || July 8 || Blue Jays || 0–4 || Dickey (7–8) || Skaggs (4–5) || || 38,111 || 52–37
|- style="text-align:center; background:#bfb"
| 90 || July 9 || Blue Jays || 8–7 || Grilli (1–3) || Loup (2–2) || Smith (12) || 35,726 || 53–37
|- style="text-align:center; background:#bfb"
| 91 || July 10 || @ Rangers || 15–6 || Santiago (1–7) || Lewis (6–6) || || 30,686 || 54–37
|- style="text-align:center; background:#bfb"
| 92 || July 11 || @ Rangers || 3–0 || Richards (11–2) || Tepesch (3–5) || Smith (13) || 38,402 || 55–37
|- style="text-align:center; background:#bfb"
| 93 || July 12 || @ Rangers || 5–2 || Weaver (10–6) || Mikolas (0–2) || Smith (14) || 37,253 || 56–37
|- style="text-align:center; background:#bfb"
| 94 || July 13 || @ Rangers || 10–7 || Skaggs (5–5) || Baker (0–3) || Smith (15) || 34,750 || 57–37
|- style="text-align:center; background:#bbb"
|colspan=9| All–Star Break (July 14–17) AL wins 5–3
|- style="text-align:center; background:#bfb"
| 95 || July 18 || Mariners || 3–2 (16) || Santiago (2–7) || Leone (2–2) || || 42,517 || 58–37
|- style="text-align:center; background:#fbb"
| 96 || July 19 || Mariners || 2–3 (12) || Leone (3–2) || Thatcher (0–1) || Furbush (1) || 40,231 || 58–38
|- style="text-align:center; background:#bfb"
| 97 || July 20 || Mariners || 6–5 || Thatcher (1–1) || Rodney (1–4) || || 37,128 || 59–38
|- style="text-align:center; background:#fbb"
| 98 || July 21 || Orioles || 2–4 || Norris (8–6) || Shoemaker (7–3) || Britton (17) || 39,028 || 59–39
|- style="text-align:center; background:#fbb"
| 99 || July 22 || Orioles || 2–4 || González (5–5) || Morin (2–3) || Britton (18) || 35,353 || 59–40
|- style="text-align:center; background:#bfb"
| 100 || July 23 || Orioles || 3–2 || Weaver (11–6) || Hunter (2–2) || Street (25) || 40,185 || 60–40
|- style="text-align:center; background:#fbb"
| 101 || July 24 || Tigers || 4–6 || Scherzer (12–3) || Richards (11–3) || Nathan (21) || 40,146 || 60–41
|- style="text-align:center; background:#bfb"
| 102 || July 25 || Tigers || 2–1 || Morin (3–3) || Smyly (6–9) || Street (26) || 42,915 || 61–41
|- style="text-align:center; background:#bfb"
| 103 || July 26 || Tigers || 4–0 || Shoemaker (8–3) || Verlander (9–9) || || 43,569 || 62–41
|- style="text-align:center; background:#bfb"
| 104 || July 27 || Tigers || 2–1 || Smith (4–0) || Chamberlain (1–4) || Street (27) || 36,252 || 63–41
|- style="text-align:center; background:#fbb"
| 105 || July 29 || @ Orioles || 6–7 (12) || Webb (3–1) || Rasmus (2–1) || || 36,882 || 63–42
|- style="text-align:center; background:#fbb"
| 106 || July 30 || @ Orioles || 3–4 || Gausman (5–3) || Richards (11–4) || Britton (21) || 27,195 || 63–43
|- style="text-align:center; background:#bfb"
| 107 || July 31 || @ Orioles || 1–0 (13) || Santiago (3–7) || Webb (3–2) || Street (28) || 24,974 || 64–43
|-

|- style="text-align:center; background:#bfb"
| 108 || August 1 || @ Rays || 5–3 || Shoemaker (9–3) || Hellickson (0–1) || Street (29) || 20,969 || 65–43
|- style="text-align:center; background:#fbb"
| 109 || August 2 || @ Rays || 3–10 || Archer (7–6) || Wilson (8–7) || || 26,656 || 65–44
|- style="text-align:center; background:#bfb"
| 110 || August 3 || @ Rays || 7–5 || Weaver (12–6) || Odorizzi (7–9) || Street (30) || 25,877 || 66–44
|- style="text-align:center; background:#bfb"
| 111 || August 4 || @ Dodgers || 5–0 || Richards (12–4) || Greinke (12–7) || || 53,166 || 67–44
|- style="text-align:center; background:#fbb"
| 112 || August 5 || @ Dodgers || 4–5 || Jansen (2–3) || Jepsen (0–1) || || 53,051 || 67–45
|- style="text-align:center; background:#fbb"
| 113 || August 6 || Dodgers || 1–2 || Haren (9–9) || Shoemaker (9–4) || Jansen (32) || 43,669 || 67–46
|- style="text-align:center; background:#fbb"
| 114 || August 7 || Dodgers || 0–7 || Ryu (13–5) || Wilson (8–8) || || 44,561 || 67–47
|- style="text-align:center; background:#fbb"
| 115 || August 8 || Red Sox || 2–4 || Webster (2–1) || Weaver (12–7) || Uehara (24) || 38,016 || 67–48
|- style="text-align:center; background:#bfb"
| 116 || August 9 || Red Sox || 5–4 (19) || Shoemaker (10–4) || Workman (1–6) || || 42,159 || 68–48
|- style="text-align:center; background:#fbb"
| 117 || August 10 || Red Sox || 1–3 || De La Rosa (4–4) || Smith (4–1) || Uehara (25) || 36,300 || 68–49
|- style="text-align:center; background:#bfb"
| 118 || August 12 || Phillies || 7–2 || Wilson (9–8) || Bastardo (5–6) || || 37,296 || 69–49
|- style="text-align:center; background:#bfb"
| 119 || August 13 || Phillies || 4–3 || Weaver (13–7) || Burnett (6–13) || Street (31) || 38,802 || 70–49
|- style="text-align:center; background:#bfb"
| 120 || August 15 || @ Rangers || 5–4 || Richards (13–4) || Martinez (2–9) || Street (32) || 31,485 || 71–49
|- style="text-align:center; background:#bfb"
| 121 || August 16 || @ Rangers || 5–4 || Shoemaker (11–4) || Lewis (8–10) || Street (33) || 32,209 || 72–49
|- style="text-align:center; background:#fbb"
| 122 || August 17 || @ Rangers || 2–3 || Feliz (1–1) || Street (1–1) || || 28,942 || 72–50
|- style="text-align:center; background:#bfb"
| 123 || August 18 || @ Red Sox || 4–2 || Wilson (10–8) || Workman (1–7) || Jepsen (1) || 35,170 || 73–50
|- style="text-align:center; background:#bfb"
| 124 || August 19 || @ Red Sox || 4–3 || Smith (5–1) || Uehara (5–3) || Street (34) || 35,471 || 74–50
|- style="text-align:center; background:#bfb"
| 125 || August 20 || @ Red Sox || 8–3 || Rasmus (3–1) || Buchholz (5–8) || || 35,136 || 75–50
|- style="text-align:center; background:#bfb"
| 126 || August 21 || @ Red Sox || 2–0 || Shoemaker (12–4) || De La Rosa (4–5) || Grilli (12) || 36,160 || 76–50
|- style="text-align:center; background:#fbb"
| 127 || August 22 || @ Athletics || 3–5 || Gray (13–7) || Grilli (1–4) || Doolittle (19) || 33,810 || 76–51
|- style="text-align:center; background:#fbb"
| 128 || August 23 || @ Athletics || 1–2 || Gregerson (3–2) || Smith (5–2) || Doolittle (20) || 36,067 || 76–52
|- style="text-align:center; background:#bfb"
| 129 || August 24 || @ Athletics || 9–4 || Weaver (14–7) || Kazmir (14–6) || || 36,067 || 77–52
|- style="text-align:center; background:#fbb"
| 130 || August 25 || Marlins || 1–7 || Cosart (11–8) || LeBlanc (0–1) || || 35,350 || 77–53
|- style="text-align:center; background:#bfb"
| 131 || August 26 || Marlins || 8–2 || Shoemaker (13–4) || Eovaldi (6–9) || || 33,028 || 78–53
|- style="text-align:center; background:#bfb"
| 132 || August 27 || Marlins || 6–1 || Santiago (4–7) || Álvarez (10–6) || || 34,657 || 79–53
|- style="text-align:center; background:#bfb"
| 133 || August 28 || Athletics || 4–3 (10) || Salas (5–0) || Cook (1–2) || || 41,056 || 80–53
|- style="text-align:center; background:#bfb"
| 134 || August 29 || Athletics || 4–0 || Weaver (15–7) || Lester (13–9) || || 41,177 || 81–53
|- style="text-align:center; background:#bfb"
| 135 || August 30 || Athletics || 2–0 || Herrera (1–1) || Samardzija (6–11) || Street (35) || 44,018 || 82–53
|- style="text-align:center; background:#bfb"
| 136 || August 31 || Athletics || 8–1 || Shoemaker (14–4) || Kazmir (14–7) || || 44,205 || 83–53
|-

|- style="text-align:center; background:#fbb"
| 137 || September 2 || @ Astros || 3–8 || Peacock (4–8) || Wilson (10–9) || || 16,131 || 83–54
|- style="text-align:center; background:#fbb"
| 138 || September 3 || @ Astros || 1–4 || McHugh (8–9) || Weaver (15–8) || Qualls (17) || 16,949 || 83–55
|- style="text-align:center; background:#bfb"
| 139 || September 4 || @ Twins || 5–4 || Smith (6–2) || Perkins (3–2) || Street (36) || 21,914 || 84–55
|- style="text-align:center; background:#bfb"
| 140 || September 5 || @ Twins || 7–6 (10) || Street (2–1) || Burton (2–4) || Jepsen (2) || 23,477 || 85–55
|- style="text-align:center; background:#bfb"
| 141 || September 6 || @ Twins || 8–5 || Smith (7–2) || Burton (2–5) || Street (37) || 28,924 || 86–55
|- style="text-align:center; background:#bfb"
| 142 || September 7 || @ Twins || 14–4 || Wilson (11–9) || Darnell (0–2) || || 25,419 || 87–55
|- style="text-align:center; background:#bfb"
| 143 || September 8 || @ Indians || 12-3 || Weaver (16–8) || Salazar (6–7) || || 15,116 || 88-55
|- style="text-align:center; background:#bfb"
| 144 || September 9 || @ Rangers || 9–3 || Santiago (5–7) || Lewis (9–13) || || 26,054 || 89–55
|- style="text-align:center; background:#bfb"
| 145 || September 10 || @ Rangers || 8–1 || Shoemaker (15–4) || Tepesch (4–10) || || 26,611 || 90–55
|- style="text-align:center; background:#bfb"
| 146 || September 11 || @ Rangers || 7–3 || Morin (4–3) || Martinez (3–11) || || 27,129 || 91–55
|- style="text-align:center; background:#bfb"
| 147 || September 12 || Astros || 11–3 || Wilson (12–9) || Oberholtzer (5–11) || || 33,339 || 92–55
|- style="text-align:center; background:#bfb"
| 148 || September 13 || Astros || 5–2 || Weaver (17–8) || Feldman (8–11) || Street (38) || 38,041 || 93–55
|- style="text-align:center; background:#fbb"
| 149 || September 14 || Astros || 1–6 || Keuchel (11-9) || Santiago (5-8) || || 35,364 || 93–56
|- style="text-align:center; background:#bfb"
| 150 || September 15 || Mariners || 8–1 || Shoemaker (16-4) || Iwakuma (14-8) || || 36,137 || 94–56
|- style="text-align:center; background:#fbb"
| 151 || September 16 || Mariners || 2–13 || Smith (1–0) || Grilli (1–5) || || 36,193 || 94–57
|- style="text-align:center; background:#bfb"
| 152 || September 17 || Mariners || 5–0 || Wilson (13–9) || Paxton (6–3) || || 36,875 || 95–57
|- style="text-align:center; background:#fbb"
| 153 || September 18 || Mariners || 1–3 || Wilhelmsen (3–2) || Jepsen (0–2) || Rodney (46) || 40,835 || 95–58
|- style="text-align:center; background:#fbb"
| 154 || September 19 || Rangers || 3–12 || Bonilla (2–0) || Santiago (5–9) || || 38,467 || 95–59
|- style="text-align:center; background:#bfb"
| 155 || September 20 || Rangers || 8–5 || Weaver (18–8) || Lewis (10–14) || Street (39) || 35,890 || 96–59
|- style="text-align:center; background:#fbb"
| 156 || September 21 || Rangers || 1–2 || Tolleson (3-1) || Street (1-2) || Feliz (11) || 27,166 || 96–60
|- style="text-align:center; background:#fbb"
| 157 || September 22 || @ Athletics || 4–8 || Samardzija (5-5) || Wilson (13-10)  || || 25,455 || 96–61
|- style="text-align:center; background:#bfb"
| 158 || September 23 || @ Athletics || 2–0 || LeBlanc (1-1) || Gray (13-10) || Street (40) || 27,588 || 97–61
|- style="text-align:center; background:#bfb"
| 159 || September 24 || @ Athletics || 5–4 || Santiago (6-9) || Lester (16-11) || Street (41) || 27,989 || 98–61
|- style="text-align:center; background:#fbb"
| 160 || September 26 || @ Mariners || 3–4 || Iwakuma (15-9) || Weaver (18-9) || Rodney (48) || 26,865 || 98–62
|- style="text-align:center; background:#fbb"
| 161 || September 27 || @ Mariners || 1–2 (11) || Leone (8-2) || Morin (4-4) || || 32,716 || 98–63
|- style="text-align:center; background:#fbb"
| 162 || September 28 || @ Mariners || 1–4 || Hernández (15-6) || Rasmus (3-2) || || 40,823 || 98–64
|-

|- style="text-align:center;"
| Legend:       = Win       = Loss       = PostponementBold = Angels team member

Post-season

Divisional series

Postseason game log

|- style="text-align:center; background:#ffbbbb;"
| 1 || October 2 || Royals ||2–3 (11) || Duffy (1–0) || Salas (0–1) ||Holland (1) ||45,321  || 0–1
|- style="text-align:center; background:#ffbbbb;"
| 2 || October 3 || Royals || 1–4 (11) || Finnegan (1-0) || Jepsen (0-1) || Holland (2) || 45,361 || 0–2
|- style="text-align:center; background:#ffbbbb;"
| 3 || October 5 || @ Royals || 3–8 ||Shields (1–0) || Wilson (0–1) ||  || 40,657 || 0–3
|-

|- style="text-align:center;"
| Legend:       = Win       = Loss       = PostponementBold = Angels team member

Roster

Farm system

See also
Los Angeles Angels
Angel Stadium

References

External links
2014 Los Angeles Angels Official Site
2014 Los Angeles Angels season at Baseball Reference

Los Angeles Angels seasons
Los Angeles Angels
Los Angeles Angels
American League West champion seasons